Pac-Man and the Ghostly Adventures 2, also known in Japan as  is a 2014 video game for the Wii U, Nintendo 3DS, Xbox 360 and PlayStation 3, released on October 14, 2014. It is the sequel to Pac-Man and the Ghostly Adventures.

Development
The game was first announced on March 1, 2014.

Gameplay 
Just like the original game, Pac-Man and the Ghostly Adventures 2 uses the same features as its predecessor, but features new story lines, characters and worlds. The game consists of new playable characters, like Spiral and Cylindria, and five different worlds, each containing between 10 and 20 levels. These levels can come in the form of power-up trials, where players are given a certain ability and are taught how to use it, while some are vehicle courses. In levels, Pac-Man can consume specific pellets that give him powers, like the ability to freeze enemies, jump higher than normal, throw fireballs, or stick to metallic platforms.

Reception

Just like its predecessor, Pac-Man and the Ghostly Adventures 2 received mixed reviews upon release.

Hardcore Gamer gave the game a 3 out of 5, saying "While the first title burst onto the scene brimming with creativity not usually seen in a television cartoon adaption, the sequel is content to emulate everything that title did without adding anything notable of its own."

News10 gave the game a 1.5 out of 4, saying "Pac-Man and the Ghostly Adventures 2 is in a weird place for a kids' video game. Younger and more novice gamers might find the game too difficult to play at times, and it may turn them off from it. Those at the older end of the kids' game scene might instead find the game too simple at times and justifiably frustrating to control. Kids who really enjoy the television program will no doubt want (and probably enjoy) this game based on its subject matter alone. Those who aren't in love with modern Pac-Man might want to let this game give up the ghost."

The Guardian gave the game a negative review, saying "In some ways, the game’s simple ambitions would not have been a problem if the recipe had been respectfully crafted. But to a modern audience spolied for choice when it comes to excellent family games, it is something of a travesty."

Notes

References

External links

2014 video games
3D platform games
Bandai Namco games
Namco games
Pac-Man
Cancelled Windows games
Nintendo 3DS games
Nintendo 3DS eShop games
Wii U games
Wii U eShop games
PlayStation 3 games
Xbox 360 games
Video games developed in the United States
Platform games
Video game sequels
Multiplayer and single-player video games
Monkey Bar Games games